Punam Devi is an Indian politician. She is the current sarpanch of Bakauli Kala village in Dhanghata Tehsil of Sant Kabir Nagar District in the state of Uttar Pradesh, India. She is an anti-corruption activist who also focuses on village development and social issues. She is currently focused on creating new development strategies to address development in poor villages. Punam Devi filed a complaint in reference to the irregularity of the public distribution system in the Bakauli Kala village on international women day (8 March 2016). Punam Devi has also participated in a rally with local women.

References

Year of birth missing (living people)
Living people
Indian anti-corruption activists
Women in Uttar Pradesh politics
People from Sant Kabir Nagar district
Indian women activists
Activists from Uttar Pradesh
21st-century Indian women politicians
21st-century Indian politicians